Bojan Đorđević (also transliterated Bojan Djordjević; born 5 April 1984) is a Serbian footballer who last played for Radnički Niš in Serbian SuperLiga.

References

External links
 
 
 
 Bojan Đorđević at Utakmica.rs 

1984 births
Living people
Sportspeople from Niš
Serbian footballers
FK Radnički Niš players
FK Srem players
CSM Unirea Alba Iulia players
Expatriate footballers in Iceland
Expatriate footballers in Romania
FK Novi Pazar players
Red Star Belgrade footballers
Serbian SuperLiga players
FK Napredak Kruševac players
Association football defenders
Serbian expatriate sportspeople in Iceland